uwantme2killhim? (also known as U Want Me 2 Kill Him? and stylised as Uwantme2killhim?) is a 2013 British thriller film directed by Andrew Douglas. The film stars Jamie Blackley and Toby Regbo and premiered at the Edinburgh International Film Festival, where the two actors won the Best Performance in a British Feature Film award. The film is loosely based on a true story and follows two teenage schoolboys who are drawn into a complicated world of online chatrooms, eventually leading to bizarre consequences.

Plot
In 2003, Detective Inspector Sarah Clayton (Joanne Froggatt) tries to establish why British schoolboy Mark (Jamie Blackley) would want to stab John (Toby Regbo). The two were supposed to be friends, yet Mark claims that the crime was necessary. As she looks deeper into the crime and the two teenagers, she discovers that Mark frequented chatrooms and became fascinated with Rachel (Jaime Winstone), a woman he met in one such room. With her prompting, he agrees to make friends with her brother John. Mark quickly begins to fall for her, sympathising with her tales of domestic abuse by her boyfriend Kevin (Mingus Johnston) while believing that they cannot meet because she is in a witness protection program.

Mark is horrified when John informs him that Kevin has killed Rachel, and he begins planning revenge against Kevin. Mark's sanity has been slowly coming apart, culminating in his beginning his plans to stab John after a chat with Janet (Liz White), an MI5 agent, who tells him that John is a person of interest to the agency. It is eventually revealed that John orchestrated the entire plot and that there is no Rachel or Janet, and that he pretended to be various people in order to get to Mark.

Cast
 Jamie Blackley as Mark
 Toby Regbo as John
 Joanne Froggatt as DI Sarah Clayton
 Liz White as Janet
 Jaime Winstone as Rachel
 Mark Womack as Mark's Dad
 Amy Wren as Zoey
 Louise Delamere as Mark's Mum
 James Burrows as Ryan Robins
 Stephanie Leonidas as Kelly
 Mingus Johnston as Kevin

Reception
Critical reception for uwantme2killhim? was mixed to positive. Common praise in the reviews typically centre upon Blackley and Regbo's acting, with the Screen Daily commenting that the two delivered "strong performances". Other reviews questioned the film's need to repeat plot elements and the believability of some of the scenes.

Awards
2013 Edinburgh International Film Festival, Best performance in a British feature film Award

References

External links
 Official website (Archive copy)
 

2013 thriller films
British thriller films
British films based on actual events
Films about witness protection
Films set in 2003
Films set in the United Kingdom
Films produced by Steve Golin
Films produced by Bryan Singer
Films shot at Elstree Film Studios
2010s English-language films
2010s British films